The Gene Machine is a graphical point-and-click action adventure game, originally released in 1996 and published by Vic Tokai. It was developed by Divide By Zero.

It describes the adventures of a fictional British gentleman named Piers Featherstonehaugh and his manservant Mossop. The plot shares many common elements with Jules Verne's Around the World in Eighty Days, Twenty Thousand Leagues Under the Sea and From the Earth to the Moon, as well as many other literary and historical references to Victorian England, such as Sherlock Holmes, Treasure Island, The Time Machine, Dr. Jekyll and Mr. Hyde, Jack the Ripper and many others.

External links
Review of The Gene Machineon Just Adventure 
The Gene Machine on GameFAQs

Sources

1996 video games
Adventure games
DOS games
DOS-only games
Point-and-click adventure games
Steampunk video games
Vic Tokai games
Video games developed in the United Kingdom
Video games set in London
Video games set in the 19th century
Video games based on works by Jules Verne